Nupur Mehta is an Indian actress. She was a part of the credited cast in Hindi movie Jo Bole So Nihaal. Mehta has also starred in TV advertisements for Fanta and Pirelli, and been part of a Fiat calendar. She was on the cover of Sportswear International’s June 2001 issue. She featured on the cover of one of India's first Mills & Boon books written by Astha Atray, His Monsoon Bride, after being chosen in a model hunt contest.

Filmography

Allegations of match fixing
The Sunday Times carried out a sting operation on a Delhi based bookie based on allegations that the ICC World Cup 2011 semi-final between India and Pakistan was fixed. A Hindi film actress was indicated to have been used to lure cricketers. The report included a blurred image resembling Mehta, who denied any role in the sting.
She is considering to sue the British Paper.
On 11 June 2012 Mehta was questioned by ICC's anti-corruption officer Alan Peacock in Mumbai.

References

External links
 

Living people
1980 births